Merchán is a surname. Notable people with the surname include:

Chucho Merchán (born 1952), Colombian bassist and guitarist
Emilio Merchán (born 1976), Spanish sprint and marathon canoeist
Jesús Merchán (born 1981), Venezuelan baseball player
José María Merchán (born 1976), Spanish triathlete
Robinson Merchán (born 1964), Venezuelan road racing cyclist
Sebastián Merchán (born 1987), Ecuadorian racing driver